Perivoli is a village in the southern part of the island of Corfu, Greece.  It is part of the municipal unit of Korissia.  In 2011 its population was 1378 for the village, and 1427 for the community, including the village Potamia.  Perivoli is 1 km northwest of Vitalades, 4 km west of Lefkimmi, 4 km southeast of Argyrades and 24 km south of the city of Corfu. The Greek National Road 25 (Corfu - Argyrades - Lefkimmi) passes through the village. The small fishing port Kalyviotis is to the north, and the Agia Varvara beach is to the southwest.

Population

See also

List of settlements in the Corfu regional unit

References

External links
 Perivoli at the GTP Travel Pages

Populated places in Corfu (regional unit)